The 1893 Navy Midshipmen football team represented the United States Naval Academy during the 1893 college football season. In their first and only season under head coach John A. Hartwell, the Midshipmen compiled a 5–3 record, shut out two opponents, and outscored all opponents by a combined score of 122 to 78.

Schedule

References

Navy
Navy Midshipmen football seasons
Navy Midshipmen football